Calliotropis nomisma is a species of sea snail, a marine gastropod mollusk in the family Eucyclidae.

Description
The shell grows to a height of 10.5 mm.

Distribution
This marine species occurs off Indonesia.

References

External links
 

nomisma
Gastropods described in 2007